Juárez de Souza Teixeira (born 25 September 1973) is a former Brazilian footballer.

In the 2005–06 season, he joined Udinese on free transfer. In the first month for Udinese, he suffered from injury.

He played 3 matches at UEFA Champions League Group Stage, as Cesare Natali and Felipe's backup. He also played once at UEFA Cup.

At international level he capped for Brazil U20 at 1993 FIFA World Youth Championship.

References

External links
 
 Profile at CBF 
 Profile at Futpedia 
 Profile at La Gazzetta dello Sport 

1973 births
Living people
Brazilian footballers
Brazil under-20 international footballers
Brazilian expatriate footballers
Associação Portuguesa de Desportos players
Yverdon-Sport FC players
Servette FC players
U.S. Lecce players
Bologna F.C. 1909 players
A.C.N. Siena 1904 players
Udinese Calcio players
Swiss Super League players
Serie A players
Brazilian expatriate sportspeople in Italy
Brazilian expatriate sportspeople in Switzerland
Expatriate footballers in Italy
Expatriate footballers in Switzerland
Association football central defenders
Footballers from São Paulo